Lei Lani Stelle is a professor of biology and chair of the Department of Biology at the University of Redlands.

Education
Stelle earned a B.A. in marine biology from the University of California, Santa Cruz. She also earned an M.Sc. in zoology from the University of British Columbia and a Ph.D. in organismic biology, ecology, and evolution from the University of California, Los Angeles.

Career 
From 2001 to 2002, Stelle was a lecturer at the University of California, Los Angeles, and from 2002 to 2008 an  assistant professor at Rochester Institute of Technology. She  joined the University of Redlands as a professor of biology in 2008.

Stelle has taught courses in introductory biology, comparative animal physiology, marine ecology, marine mammal biology, and research. She has also led travel courses focused on marine conservation to Mexico, the Pacific Northwest, Canada, and Ecuador/Galápagos Islands.

Research
Stelle's research projects focus on the impact of humans on marine mammals in Southern California. Her studies include the distribution of blue whales, boat disturbance of sea lions, and behavior of dolphins. She is co-developer of an app called Whale mAPP that allows users to track sightings of marine mammals using GIS.

Awards 
 LENS Faculty Fellow, Keck Foundation, 2011
 American Association of University Women, American Fellow, 2006
 UCLA, James Memorial Dissertation Award, 2001

Selected publications
Stelle, L.L., King, M.* (2015) “Whale mAPP: Citizen Scientists Contribute and Map Marine Mammal Sightings”. Chapter in Ocean Solutions, Earth Solutions, ESRI Press, Redlands, CA.
Stelle, L.L., Blake, R.W., and Trites, A.W. (2000) “Hydrodynamic Drag in Steller Sea Lions (Eumetopias jubatus)”.  Journal of Experimental Biology, 203: 1915–1923.

References 

21st-century American biologists
University of Redlands faculty
Year of birth missing (living people)
Living people
Place of birth missing (living people)
American marine biologists
American women biologists
University of California, Santa Cruz alumni
University of British Columbia alumni
University of California, Los Angeles alumni
Rochester Institute of Technology faculty
Women marine biologists
American women academics
21st-century American women scientists